ASFA may refer to:

Adoption and Safe Families Act
Alabama School of Fine Arts
American Samoa Football Association
American Sighthound Field Association
American Society for Apheresis
Anuncio de Señales y Frenado Automático, Spanish train protection system
Aquatic Sciences and Fisheries Abstracts
Aramean Syriac Football Association
ASFA Soccer League
ASFA Yennega
Association of Science Fiction and Fantasy Artists
Association of Special Fares Agents
Athens School of Fine Arts
Abryanz Style and Fashion Awards (ASFAs)
Asfa may refer to:
Asfa Wossen